Baidu Patents, or Baidu Zhuanli (Chinese: 百度专利) is a Chinese free online patent search service, launched on 1 January 2008.

Overview
The Baidu Patents search engine is the result of a collaboration between the China Patent Information Center (CPIC), the Chinese Patent Office (SIPO) and Baidu. 

Baidu Patent Search is said to be integrated with a patent database which amounts to 2.7 million Chinese patents.

See also
Google Patents
Software industry in China
China Software Industry Association

References

External links
Baidu Patents 
Aleanca Search Engine

Patents
Patent search services